The 2018 Major League Rugby Final was the championship match of the inaugural season of Major League Rugby (MLR), a rugby union club competition in the United States. It was played on July 7, 2018, at Torero Stadium in San Diego, California, between the Glendale Raptors and the Seattle Seawolves. Seattle won the match 23–19 to take their first title.

The Glendale and Seattle teams finished first and second in the regular season, respectively, and advanced to the MLR Championship Series, contesting the semifinals against San Diego and Utah.

Background

Major League Rugby was established in 2017 and began play in April 2018.

Seattle and Glendale played each other twice during the regular season, with Glendale winning both matches.

Venue

Torero Stadium, home field of Major League Rugby team San Diego Legion, was selected as the venue for the final before the beginning of the Championship Series playoffs. The stadium with a seating capacity of 6,000 on the campus of the University of San Diego is also home to the various athletics teams of the university.

Broadcasting

The match was broadcast on CBS Sports Network. Dan Power served as the play by play commentator for CBS and was joined by color analysts Brian Hightower and Peter Steinberg.

Match

Details

{| border="0" width="100%" class="collapsible"
|-
!Team details
|-
|

{| width=100% style="font-size: 90%"
|
Most Valuable Player:
Vili Tolutaʻu (Seattle)Assistant Referees: Adam Leal (England)
 Derek Summers (United States)Television Match Official:' Marc Nelson (United States)
|}
|}

Highlights

The champion Seattle Seawolves was awarded the "America's Championship Shield", an oversized  metal shield of the MLR logo, which they hoisted. Seawolves flanker Vili Tolutaʻu was named the MLR Championship Series "MVP", equivalent to man of the match. For his efforts, he received a Shinola Detroit'' American Made watch.

References

External links

Major League Rugby Finals
Major League Rugby final
Rugby union matches